The George L. Coleman Sr. House, at 1001 Rockdale St. in Miami, Oklahoma, was built in 1918. It was listed on the National Register of Historic Places in 1983. The listing included two contributing buildings and a contributing structure.

It is a two-and-a-half-story mansion complex including the house, a courtyard, and a garage, all attached to each other, with overall  plan.  It has Georgian Revival features.  Its red brick walls have brick laid in common bond.

See also
Coleman Theatre, also NRHP-listed in 1983 in Miami

References

National Register of Historic Places in Ottawa County, Oklahoma
Georgian architecture in Oklahoma
Houses completed in 1918
Miami, Oklahoma